Balad Ruz Sport Club is an Iraqi football team based in Balad Ruz, Diyala, that plays in Iraq Division Two.

Managerial history

  Hameed Abid Hassan

See also 
 2000–01 Iraqi Elite League
 2020–21 Iraq FA Cup
 2021–22 Iraq FA Cup

References

External links
 Balad Ruz SC on Goalzz.com
 Iraq Clubs- Foundation Dates

1991 establishments in Iraq
Association football clubs established in 1991
Football clubs in Diyala